Ko Seong-il (Hangul: 고성일; born July 18, 1971) is a South Korean voice actor who joined the Munhwa Broadcasting Corporation's Voice Acting Division in 1999.

Roles

Broadcast TV
 Ojamajo Doremi (Korea TV EDition, MBC)
 Bikkuriman (Bumerang Fighter, Korea TV Edition, MBC)
 Submarine 707 (Korea TV Edition, MBC)
 The Penguins of Madagascar (Kowalski)
 VeggieTales (Pa Grape)

Broadcast radio
 History 50 (MBC)
 Rabihem Polis (MBC)
 Redmoon (MBC)
 Masca (MBC)
 Hotel Africa (MBC)

Movie dubbing
 Hammerboy (Character Plan)
 Crayon Shin Chan (Korea TV Edition, MBC)
 Antz (Korea TV Edition, MBC)

See also
 Munhwa Broadcasting Corporation
 MBC Voice Acting Division

Homepage
 MBC Voice Acting Division Ko Seong Il Blog (in Korean)
 Ad Sound Ko Seong Il Blog (in Korean)

1971 births
South Korean male voice actors
Living people